Gambia Ports Authority Football Club is a Gambian football club based in Banjul and sponsored by the Gambia Ports Authority. They play in the top division in Gambian football, the GFA League First Division.

History
The Gambia Ports Authority was established in 1973 and the core of their players were snatched from Real de Banjul. It became one of the best clubs in the country with players like Goalkeeper Saho, Alhaji Sarr, Kabba Ceesay, to name a few.

The GPA won their first cup title in 1975 and a year later appeared in the first edition of the African Cup Winners' Cup in 1976 and challenged RS Kadiogo of Upper Volta, a nation now named Burkina Faso.  In 1983, they made their first continental championship appearance in 1983 and lost to Dakar's ASC Diaraf from the surrounding neighbour Senegal in the away match 0–4, they won the home match 0–2 but half the total of Diaraf's, they were out of the continental championship competition.  In the 1985 African Cup of Champions Clubs, the club advanced as a walkover as USFA Ouagadougou of Burkina Faso withdrew.  After advancing into the first round, the club lost the match to Morocco's FAR Rabat 8–0 and made their worst defeat at the continentals, afterwards, the GPA withdrew from further competition.

In 1988/89, the club ceased to exist and in its place came Waterside FC which was the club feeder team.

In 1996, Falcons FC, which won the Banjul Nawetaan, was transformed to GPA FC. The team gained promotion from the 3rd division while coached by Ebou Faye, who also doubled up as player. He scored a brace of goals that secured the club's promotion to the 2nd division. He coached the team until it was on the threshold of gaining promotion but then left, and Kabba Ceesay took over as the coach. After two seasons, Modou Lamin Fofana Faraba, the caretaker coach, took over as the coach. He won the championship in 1998/99 season and FTI trophy.

In 2001, Demba Ramata took over for a season before Ebou Faye took over again for three seasons. Alhaji Sarr, took over in the 2005/06 season and this period could be described as the golden period of the club as they won the league in his first year. They followed this with the Super Cup and FA Cup in his second season. Following their league win, the headed to the 2007 CAF Champions League and made their first continental win in a match against Ghana's Asante Kotoko, they headed to the First Round and faced Nasarawa United from Nigeria, they made their recent continental win in the home match 2–1, they lost the away match 3–0 and were kicked out from further competition. On 4 December 2007, he left and Lukeh became coach until May 19, 2008 when he was sacked by the GFA and in July, Malamin Fofana became coach for the Ports Authority FC. Later in July, the GPA finished 11th place and was relegated from the First Division, they participated in the Second Division for 2009 and later returned into the GFA League First Division once more.

The GPA won their league title in 2010 and yet again headed to the continentals a year later, the 2011 CAF Champions League, they challenged ASC Diaraf for the second time out of the neighbouring Senegal, they lost the home match 0–2, they made their only draw numbering a goal, it was also GPA's last continental match.  In the mid-2010s, Njunga Ngiram became coach of the Ports Authority team.  In 2016, the GPA headed to win their recent league title.

Honours
Gambian Championnat National D1: 6
 1984, 1986, 1999, 2006, 2010, 2016.

Gambian Cup: 3
 1975, 1980, 2007.

Gambian Super Cup: 3
 2006, 2007, 2016.

League and cup history

Performance in CAF competitions

1USFA Ouadagoudou withdrew
2The Ports Authority withdrew before playing the second leg
3The Ports Authority were disqualified in the First Round

National level

Statistics
Best position: First Round (continental)
Best position at a cup competition: Preliminary Round (continental)
Total matches played at the CAF Champions League: 10
Total matches played at home: 4
Total matches played away: 5
Total matches played at the continental cup competitions: 4

Coaches

References

External links
 The History Of GPA Football Club
 Official Site
 Profile of the club at Soccerway

Football clubs in the Gambia
1973 establishments in the Gambia
Association football clubs established in 1973
Works association football teams